Nepenthes treubiana (after Melchior Treub) is a tropical pitcher plant native to Western New Guinea and the island of Misool (including a number of smaller islands).

This species occurs on the cliffs of the McCluer Gulf and in coastal regions of the Fakfak peninsula. Large subpopulations are now confirmed on Misool. Geographer Stewart McPherson had been unable to find any plants during a prior trip to the island (although he did find N. sp. Misool).

Nepenthes treubiana has no known natural hybrids. No forms or varieties have been described.

References

Further reading

 Bauer, U., C.J. Clemente, T. Renner & W. Federle 2012. Form follows function: morphological diversification and alternative trapping strategies in carnivorous Nepenthes pitcher plants. Journal of Evolutionary Biology 25(1): 90–102. 
 Clarke, C.M. 2006. Introduction. In: Danser, B.H. The Nepenthaceae of the Netherlands Indies. Natural History Publications (Borneo), Kota Kinabalu. pp. 1–15.
 Macfarlane, J.M. 1911. New species of Nepenthes. Contributions from the Botanical Laboratory of the University of Pennsylvania 3(3): 207–210. (plates I–II)
  Mansur, M. 2001.  In: Prosiding Seminar Hari Cinta Puspa dan Satwa Nasional. Lembaga Ilmu Pengetahuan Indonesia, Bogor. pp. 244–253.
  Marwinski, D. 2014. Eine Expedition nach West-Papua oder auf den Spuren von Nepenthes paniculata. Das Taublatt 78: 11–44.
 Meimberg, H., A. Wistuba, P. Dittrich & G. Heubl 2001. Molecular phylogeny of Nepenthaceae based on cladistic analysis of plastid trnK intron sequence data. Plant Biology 3(2): 164–175. 
  Meimberg, H. 2002.  Ph.D. thesis, Ludwig Maximilian University of Munich, Munich.
 Meimberg, H. & G. Heubl 2006. Introduction of a nuclear marker for phylogenetic analysis of Nepenthaceae. Plant Biology 8(6): 831–840. 
 Mey, F.S. 2014. A short visit to Papua, video by Alastair Robinson and Davide Baj. Strange Fruits: A Garden's Chronicle, February 25, 2014.

External links
 Nepenthes treubiana in its natural habitat
 B. H. Danser's Monograph: Nepenthes treubiana

treubiana
Carnivorous plants of Asia
Flora of Western New Guinea
Plants described in 1891